The Outer Stadium Ground is a major public sports venue in Dhaka, the capital of Bangladesh. It is a multi-use stadium with a capacity of 10,000.

References

Sports venues in Dhaka
Football venues in Bangladesh